The 1935 Campeonato Nacional de Fútbol Profesional was Chilean first tier's 3rd season. Magallanes were the champions, achieving thereby three consecutive titles and being the first ever Chilean team in do it.

Scores

Standings

Topscorer

References

External links
ANFP 
RSSSF Chile 1935

Primera División de Chile seasons
Primera
Chile